San Bartolomé de las Abiertas is a municipality located in the province of Toledo, Castile-La Mancha, Spain. , the municipality had a population of 588 inhabitants.

References

Municipalities in the Province of Toledo